The Hawthorne Gold Cup Handicap is a Grade III race for thoroughbred horses run at Hawthorne Race Course in Stickney, Illinois each year. The Hawthorne Gold Cup trophy has always been made of solid gold.

The Hawthorne Gold Cup is currently a Grade III event for three-year-olds and up, at one and one-quarter miles (ten furlongs) on the dirt, and currently carries a purse of $250,000.

The Hawthorne Gold Cup was not run in 1934 and 1936 as a result of the Great Depression, not during World War II from 1940 through 1945, and not in 1978 when the grandstand was destroyed by fire. While the facilities were being rebuilt, the 1979 race was held at nearby Sportsman's Park.  The race was also not run in 2016, due to purse money hardships in Illinois.

Historically, a premier race of the season that attracted the best horses from across the United States, U.S. Hall of Fame horse Sun Beau won it three times in a row between 1929 and 1931. Other Hall of Fame inductees have their name on the Gold Cup, including Equipoise (1933), Discovery (1935), Challedon (1936), Round Table, who won it back-to-back in 1957 and 1958, Kelso (1960) and Dr. Fager in 1967.

In 1959, Day Court, ridden by Henry Moreno, set a new track record in winning the race, a record that stood until Ron Turcotte broke it again in 1970 aboard Gladwin.

In 1979, the race was run at 9 furlongs.

Records
Time record: (at current  miles distance)
 1:58. 4/5 – Gladwin (1970) and Group Plan (1974)

Largest Winning Margin: 
 10 lengths – Cryptoclearance (1988)

Most wins:
 3 – Sun Beau (1929, 1930, 1931)

Most wins by an owner:
 3 – Willis Sharpe Kilmer (1929, 1930, 1931) 
 3 – Walmac Farm (1948, 1949, 1955)

Most wins by a jockey:
 3 – William Boland (1952, 1956, 1962)

Most wins by a Trainer:
 3 – Howard Wells (1948, 1949, 1950) 
 3 – Robert J. Frankel (1983, 1984, 1985)
 3 – Todd Pletcher (2008, 2014, 2015)

Winners

References
 Chicago Barn to Wire history and details on the Hawthorne Gold Cup Handicap

Graded stakes races in the United States
Open middle distance horse races
Recurring sporting events established in 1928
Horse races in Illinois
Hawthorne Race Course
1928 establishments in Illinois